Oakhurst Primary School is situated in Oakhurst Avenue, Rondebosch, Cape Town, South Africa. In 2006 the school celebrated its 100th anniversary.

Academics
Oakhurst is a small school with one class per grade and encourages one-on-one teaching with the idea that smaller classes encourage better results.

History
Oakhurst was opened on 8 October 1906 as the Camp Ground School for Girls under the leadership of Mrs M. Garcia. It became an independent branch of Rustenburg School for Girls. It changed its name to Oakhurst Primary School in 1927 after one of the old houses on the Canigou Estate. Until 1930, boys too were admitted to the kindergarten grades.

Headmistresses
 Mrs Mabel Garcia (1906-1921)
 Miss Christine Chandler (1920-1935)
 Miss Esmé Powis (1936-1939)
 Miss L. de Smidt (1940-1954)
 Miss Elizabeth Haenni (1955-1982)
 Miss Joan McKee (1982-1997)
 Ms Anneline Lourens (1997-2006)
 Mrs Jenny Van Velden (2007–2015)
 Mrs Lorette de la Bat (2016–present)

Houses
Oakhurst houses are: Athlone (green), Buxton (red), and Clarendon (blue).

Sport
Oakhurst offers tennis, netball, hockey, and swimming.

References

External links
 Oakhurst official site

Rondebosch
Schools in Cape Town
Educational institutions established in 1906
Girls' schools in South Africa
1906 establishments in South Africa
1906 establishments in the Cape Colony